Einstein – Případy nesnesitelného génia (Einstein) is a Czech television series from Prima televize. The series is about Professor Filip Koenig, who inherited genius from his great-great-grandfather Albert Einstein and now supports the Prague criminal police as a consultant.It is based on German series Einstein.

Plot
33-year-old professor Filip Koening, born on July 25, 1986 is allegedly the great-great-grandson of Albert Einstein. Filip suffers from hereditary Huntington's disease and has 7 years left to live at most. He lives his life to the fullest due to this. When he tries to steal medicine from the doctor's office during one medical appointment to slow his deteriorating health, he is arrested and sent to prison. There he becomes involved in a murder investigation and slowly begins to unravel a complex case. The police understands that Filip could be useful with his genius reasoning. He gets an offer from the head of the Homicide Department n that he can become a consultant, or he can stay in prison. Filip chooses the first option, although he doesn't like it very much.

Cast

Episodes

Season 1

References

External links 
Official site
IMDB site
ČSFD site

Czech action television series
Czech crime television series
Czech comedy television series
2021 Czech television series debuts
Prima televize original programming
Czech television series based on non-Czech television series